Edith Clarke (February 10, 1883 – October 29, 1959) was the first woman to be professionally employed as an electrical engineer in the United States, and the first female professor of electrical engineering in the country. She was the first woman to deliver a paper at the American Institute of Electrical Engineers, the first female engineer whose professional standing was recognized by Tau Beta Pi, and the first woman named as a Fellow of the American Institute of Electrical Engineers. She specialized in electrical power system analysis and wrote Circuit Analysis of A-C Power Systems.

Early life and education
One of nine children, Edith Clarke was born to lawyer John Ridgely Clarke and Susan Dorsey Owings on February 10, 1883, in Howard County, Maryland. After being orphaned at age 12, she was raised by an older sister. She used her inheritance to study mathematics and astronomy at Vassar College, where she graduated in 1908.

After college, Clarke taught mathematics and physics at a private school in San Francisco and at Marshall College. She then spent some time studying civil engineering at the University of Wisconsin–Madison, but left to become a "computer" at AT&T in 1912. She computed for George Campbell, who applied mathematical methods to the problems of long-distance electrical transmissions. While at AT&T, she studied electrical engineering at Columbia University by night.

In 1918, Clarke enrolled at the Massachusetts Institute of Technology, and the following year she became the first woman to earn an M.S. in electrical engineering from MIT. Her thesis at MIT was supervised by Arthur E. Kennelly and was titled "Behavior of a lumpy artificial transmission line as the frequency is indefinitely increased."

Professional career
Unable to find work as an engineer, Clarke went to work for General Electric as a supervisor of computers in the Turbine Engineering Department. During this time, she invented the Clarke calculator, an early graphing calculator, a simple graphical device that solved equations involving electric current, voltage and impedance in power transmission lines. The device could solve line equations involving hyperbolic functions ten times faster than previous methods. She filed a patent for the calculator in 1921 and it was granted in 1925.
   
In 1921, Clarke took a leave of absence from GE to teach physics at the Constantinople Women's College in Turkey because she was not allowed to do electrical engineering work, was not earning the same salary and had a lower professional status as men doing the same work. The next year, when she returned from Turkey, she was offered a job by GE as a salaried electrical engineer in the Central Station Engineering Departmentthe first professional female electrical engineer in the United States. She retired from General Electric in 1945.

Her background in mathematics helped her achieve fame in her field. On February 8, 1926, as the first woman to deliver a paper at the American Institute of Electrical Engineers' (AIEE) annual meeting, she showed the use of hyperbolic functions for calculating the maximum power that a line could carry without instability. The paper was of importance because transmission lines were getting longer, leading to greater loads and more chances for system instability, and Clarke's paper provided a model that applied to large systems. Two of her later papers won awards from the AIEE: the Best Regional Paper Prize in 1932 and the Best National Paper Prize in 1941.

She also worked on the design and building of hydroelectric dams in the West Hoover Dam, contributing her electrical expertise to develop and install the turbines that generate hydropower there to this day.

In 1943, Clarke wrote an influential textbook in the field of power engineering, Circuit Analysis of A-C Power Systems, based on her notes for lectures to GE engineers. This two-volume textbook teaches about her adaption of the symmetrical components system, in which she became interested while working for the second time at GE. This system is a mathematical means for engineers to study and solve problems of power system losses and the performance of electrical equipment. Clarke adopted this system to the three-phase components that are the basis of the electrical grid in the United States. This textbook was used as the basis of education for electrical engineers for many years.

In 1947, she joined the faculty of the Electrical Engineering Department at the University of Texas at Austin, making her the first female professor of electrical engineering in the country. She taught for 10 years and retired in 1957.

In an interview with The Daily Texan on March 14, 1948, Clarke observed: "There is no demand for women engineers, as such, as there are for women doctors; but there's always a demand for anyone who can do a good piece of work."

Honors
Edith Clarke was the first female engineer to achieve professional standing in Tau Beta Pi. In 1948, Clarke was the first female Fellow of the American Institute of Electrical Engineers. She was the first woman to be accepted as a full voting member in the American Institute of Electrical Engineers. In 1954, she received the Society of Women Engineers (SWE) Achievement Award, which was presented to her by Evelyn Jetter, one of SWE's founders and inventor of the automotive ignition transistor, "in recognition of her many original contributions to stability theory and circuit analysis." Clarke was selected for inclusion in Women of Achievement in Maryland History in 1998 and was also included in American National Biography and Notable American Women of the Modern Period.

In 2015, Clarke was posthumously inducted into the National Inventors Hall of Fame.

See also
Florence Violet McKenzie

Further reading

References

External links
 "Edith Clarke", Biographies of Women Mathematicians, Agnes Scott College
 Clarke calculator patent application

American electrical engineers
American women engineers
Women inventors
20th-century American inventors
MIT School of Engineering alumni
General Electric people
University of Texas at Austin faculty
Vassar College alumni
University of Wisconsin–Madison College of Engineering alumni
1883 births
1959 deaths
Fellow Members of the IEEE
Electrical engineering academics
20th-century American engineers
20th-century women engineers
20th-century American women
American women academics